Khareb (also spelled Kharayeb)  is a Syrian village located in Tell Salhab Subdistrict in Al-Suqaylabiyah District, Hama.  According to the Syria Central Bureau of Statistics (CBS), Khareb had a population of 241 in the 2004 census.

In 2018, archaeologists revealed a Byzantine mosaic painting of a church dates back to the fifth century AD. The painting, which was decorated with geometric shapes and inscriptions in Latin, was unearthed,

References 

Populated places in al-Suqaylabiyah District